Santa Lucia di Piave is a comune  in the province of Treviso, Veneto, north-eastern Italy.

References

Cities and towns in Veneto